Leonidas L. Polk House is a historic home located at Raleigh, Wake County, North Carolina.  It was built about 1891, and is a two-story, two bay by five bay, Late Victorian Shingle Style frame dwelling with a one-story frame wing. It features a corner turret and a front sawnwork porch with star-shaped ornament.  The house was moved to the rear of 612 N. Blount Street in the mid-1960s.  It was the home of Leonidas L. Polk (1837-1892), an American farmer, journalist and political figure.

It was listed on the National Register of Historic Places in 1977.

References

External links
Polk House website

Houses on the National Register of Historic Places in North Carolina
Victorian architecture in North Carolina
Houses completed in 1891
Houses in Raleigh, North Carolina
National Register of Historic Places in Raleigh, North Carolina